Leptospermum sericatum is a species of erect shrub that is endemic to Queensland. It has thin, firm bark, narrow egg-shaped to elliptical leaves, white or pink flowers arranged usually singly on side shoots and fruit that falls from the plant when the seeds are released.

Description
Flowering occurs from September to October.

Taxonomy and naming
Leptospermum sericatum was first formally described in 1848 by John Lindley in Thomas Mitchell's Journal of an Expedition into the Interior of Tropical Australia.

Distribution and habitat
This tea-tree usually grows in crevices near sandstone cliffs and occurs in the Leichhardt district in Queensland.

Conservation status
This species is classified as "near threatened" under the Queensland Government Nature Conservation Act 1992.

References

sericatum
Myrtales of Australia
Flora of Queensland
Plants described in 1992